Peter Wittig (born 11 August 1954) is a former German diplomat and has been Germany's  Ambassador to the Court of St. James in the United Kingdom from July 2018, to April 2020, after having served as Ambassador to the United States from 30 April 2014, to 20 June 2018 and Permanent Representative at the United Nations in New York from 2009 to 2014.

Early life and education
Wittig studied at the University of Bonn, the University of Freiburg, University of Kent, and the University of Oxford. He has taught as an assistant professor at the University of Freiburg.

Diplomatic career
After joining the German foreign service in 1982, Wittig served as German ambassador to Lebanon and to Cyprus.

In 2009 Wittig was appointed to serve as Germany's permanent representative to the United Nations. Wittig has served twice as the President of the United Nations Security Council, once in July 2011 and again in September 2012. Between 2011 and 2012, he headed among other committees the Al-Qaida Sanctions Committee.

From April 2014 to June 2018 Wittig served as the German ambassador to the United States and then moved to London where he served as Germany's ambassador to the Court of St. James until his retirement from diplomatic services end April 2020.

In May 2020 he joined Scheffler Group in Germany to build up and lead a new division about global affairs. Besides that he has plans to do some academic work.

Other activities
 Atlantik-Brücke Foundation, member of the board of trustees
 International Journalists’ Programmes, Arthur F. Burns Fellowship Program, member of the board of trustees (2014–2018)

Awards
Leo Baeck Medal (2018)

Notes

External links

1954 births
Living people
Ambassadors of Germany to Cyprus
Ambassadors of Germany to Lebanon
Ambassadors of Germany to the United States
Ambassadors of Germany to the United Kingdom
Permanent Representatives of Germany to the United Nations
University of Bonn alumni
University of Freiburg alumni
Alumni of Canterbury Christ Church University
Alumni of the University of Oxford
Academic staff of the University of Freiburg